

2022 tournaments

Supertournaments

Open events

FIDE events

2023–25 World Championship cycle qualification events

Team events

Rapid and blitz tournaments

Deaths
 24 January – Mark Tseitlin
 28 January – Gilles Mirallès
 14 February – Borislav Ivkov
 7 May — Yuri Averbakh
 13 July — Igor Naumkin
 14 July — Nikolai Krogius
 2 September — Mišo Cebalo
 12 October — Konstantin Landa
 4 December — Alex Sherzer
 12 December — Iván Faragó

See also
 Carlsen–Niemann controversy

References

External links 
 Calendar by FIDE
 2022 Chess Calendar by chess24.com
 Chess Calendar by Lichess
 Chess Calendar by Chess.com

 
21st century in chess
Chess by year
2022 sport-related lists